Axis Assassin is a video game written by John Field for the Apple II and published by Electronic Arts in 1983. Ports for the Atari 8-bit family and Commodore 64 were released alongside the Apple II original. The game is similar in concept and visuals to Atari, Inc.'s 1981 Tempest arcade game.

Along with M.U.L.E., Hard Hat Mack, Archon: The Light and the Dark, and Worms?, Axis Assassin was one of the five initial titles from Electronic Arts. Author John Field was included in the two-page "We See Farther" magazine ad from 1983 that positioned EA's game developers as "rock stars." Field also wrote The Last Gladiator for Electronic Arts, which was published the same year as Axis Assassin.

Gameplay

Reception

Reviewing the Apple II version for Electronic Games in 1983, Arnie Katz wrote, "if John Field's Axis Assassin is a true foretaste of what we can expect from Electronic Arts, then there's no question that computer gaming has gained another first-rate software producer." Katz and cohort Bill Kunkel also discussed the game in the "Arcade Alley" column of Video, stating, "Axis Assassin...has only one discernable problem: its name. Despite the obvious and misleading connotations of 'Axis,' this is a semi-abstract target-shoot in the Tempest genre–not a World War II spy adventure."

A review in Computer and Video Games magazine three years after the game's release was less enthusiastic, concluding "...there's nothing really wrong with Axis Assassin, but there's no real reason why anybody should make time to play it."

See also
Tubeway, another Tempest-inspired game for the Apple II.

References

External links
Axis Assassin at Atari Mania

Apple II gameplay at YouTube

1983 video games
Electronic Arts games
Apple II games
Ariolasoft games
Atari 8-bit family games
Fixed shooters
Commodore 64 games
Video game clones
Single-player video games